Myasnikovo is a rural locality (a village) in Fominskoye Rural Settlement, Gorokhovetsky District, Vladimir Oblast, Russia. The population was 24 as of 2010.

Geography 
Myasnikovo is located 45 km southwest of Gorokhovets (the district's administrative centre) by road. Zolotovo is the nearest rural locality.

References 

Rural localities in Gorokhovetsky District